Awena is a weekly  independent Kurdish newspaper, published every Tuesday in Sulaymaniyah,  Iraqi Kurdistan .

Awena means “The Mirror” in Kurdish. The newspaper was founded by Asos Ahmed Hardi, former editor-in-chief of  Hawlati after he clashed with the owner of Hawlati and resigned.  
 Hardi is the director of the Awena (Mirror) Company, which publishes Awena.  
It began publication in January 2006. Hardi took most of his team with him from Hawlati. 

In 2008, Suzanne Fischer of the Institute for War and Peace Reporting, was quoted as saying that Awena was the only truly independent newspaper in Iraqi Kurdistan, since it was the only one to have explained its business model.

In 2009, the daily reported a circulation of 17,000.

External links
  Awena  website (Kurdish)

References

Newspapers published in Iraq
Kurdish-language mass media
Mass media in Sulaymaniyah
Weekly newspapers
2006 establishments in Iraqi Kurdistan
Publications established in 2006
Mass media in Kurdistan Region (Iraq)